Frank McDonald (born c. 1933) is an American former football player. McDonald grew up in Nutley, New Jersey, and attended the University of Miami.  He played college football at the end position for the Miami Hurricanes football team. He was selected by the Associated Press and the Football Writers Association of America as a first-team player on their respective 1954 College Football All-America Teams. He was inducted into the University of Miami Sports Hall of Fame in 1974.

References

1933 births
Date of birth missing (living people)
Living people
People from Nutley, New Jersey
Sportspeople from Essex County, New Jersey
Players of American football from New Jersey
American football ends
Miami Hurricanes football players